Honda Aero, Inc. (HAI), a wholly owned subsidiary of Honda Motor Co., Ltd., is headquartered in Burlington, North Carolina, near the Burlington - Alamance Regional Airport. The Burlington facility will serve as the primary production location for engines developed and marketed by GE Honda Aero Engines, LLC (a joint venture between Honda Aero and GE), beginning with the GE Honda HF120 turbofan engine. Development of the facility represents a $27 million capital expenditure by Honda, bringing the company's total North American capital investment to more than $9 billion. Production began with the GE Honda Aero Engine HF120 on March 17, 2015.

References

External links
 Honda Aero Website

Honda
Companies based in North Carolina